Turkey (listed as TUR) participated in the 5th AIBA Women’s World Boxing Championship held between November 22–29, 2008 at Ningbo Sports Center in Ningbo City, China.

With eleven women boxers participating, Turkey won two gold and two bronze medals. It ranked 2nd in the unofficial medal table after China.

Participants

Medals

Results by event

External links
  AIBA Championships Ningbo City 2008 official website

References 

Women's World Boxing Championships
2008 World Women's Boxing Championship
2008 in Turkish sport
2008 in Turkish women's sport